René Hasler (born 18 June 1948, in Lucerne) is a Swiss former footballer who played for FC Basel for most of his career, and the Swiss national team.

Career
Hasler started his career at FC Zürich in 1969 and left two years later to join FC Basel, where he won two league titles consecutively in 1972 and 1973, and the Swiss Cup in 1975. He then moved to Neuchâtel Xamax in 1976 where he played for three years before returning to St. Jakob Stadium, where he helped Basel win another title in 1980.

Hasler earned 25 caps for the Swiss national team, the first of which coming on 21 October 1972 in a 0–0 draw with Italy in Bern. His last game in a Switzerland shirt was a 2–1 loss to Spain on 21 September 1977, also in Bern.

Honours
Zürich
 Swiss Cup: 1970

Basel
 Swiss League: 1972, 1973, 1980
 Swiss Cup: 1975
 Swiss League Cup: 1973

References
http://www.football.ch

1948 births
Living people
Swiss men's footballers
Switzerland international footballers
FC Zürich players
FC Basel players
Neuchâtel Xamax FCS players
Association football defenders
Sportspeople from Lucerne